Judith Brenna Landon (born 1928-died 2021) was an actress and dancer who primarily played uncredited bit parts in films in the early 1950s, particularly a background dancer in movie musicals.

Career
Particularly notable roles include Eras in the film Prehistoric Women (1950) and an uncredited but recognizable performance as the silent screen vamp Olga Mara in Singin' in the Rain (1952). All of her film roles except for Prehistoric Women were in musical films, and all of her musical film roles, except in Gentlemen Prefer Blondes (1953), were made by Metro-Goldwyn-Mayer. Prior to her film career she had danced with various theatrical groups including the Los Angeles Civic Light Opera.  After her film career ended she made a few television appearances, including as a ballet teacher on an episode of The Brady Bunch, and an episode of her then husband Brian Keith's show Family Affair.

Personal life
She married actor Brian Keith in 1954. They lived in a mansion in Bel-Air together and had two children and adopted three others before they divorced in 1969. She later married the English ballet dancer, Stanley Holden, to whom she remained married until his death in 2007.

Filmography
 Prehistoric Women (1950) as Eras
 An American in Paris (1951) as a dancer in the "Stairway to Paradise" sequence (uncredited)
 Singin' in the Rain (1952) as Olga Mara, a screen vamp (uncredited)
 The Band Wagon (1953) as dancer in troupe. (uncredited)
 Gentlemen Prefer Blondes (1953) as chorus girl in "Diamonds Are a Girl's Best Friend" (uncredited)
 Family Affair (1967 – 1 episode) as Margo Dunbar
 The Brady Bunch (1973 – 1 episode) as Miss Clariette

References

External links

1928 births
Living people